Consort Pan may refer to:

Pan Shu (died 252), wife of Sun Quan (Emperor Da of Eastern Wu)
Consort Pan (Liu Song) (died 453), concubine of Liu Yilong (Emperor Wen of Liu Song)
Pan Yunu (died 501), concubine of Xiao Baojuan (emperor of Southern Qi)
Princess Pan (968–989), first wife of the future Emperor Zhenzong of Song

See also
Consort Ban ( 48–2 BC), concubine of Emperor Cheng of Han